Alden, elevation , is an unincorporated community and census-designated place in McHenry County, Illinois, United States. It was named a CDP for the 2020 census, at which time it had a population of 113.

History
Alden was laid out in 1844, and named after Alden, New York, the native home of a large share of the first settlers. A post office called Alden has been in operation since 1844.

Geography
The community is situated in the heart of Alden Township at the junction of Alden Road (County Highway V-12) and Illinois Route 173. The headwaters of Nippersink Creek originate at the High Point Unit of the McHenry County Conservation District, flowing to the southeast and east. In terms of geographic coordinates, the community is located at  (42.4589075, -88.5178757) In terms of the Public Land Survey System, Alden is located within the Southeast Quarter of Section 15 and the Northeast Quarter of Section 23, Township 46 North, Range 6 East of the Third Principal Meridian. Alden is served by the Harvard, Illinois 60033 post office.

Demographics

2020 census

Points of interest
A small commercial district is located at the highway junction. The Alden Township facility is just south of the community at 8515 Alden Road.

See also
Alden Township, McHenry County, Illinois

References 

Unincorporated communities in Illinois
Census-designated places in Illinois
Census-designated places in McHenry County, Illinois
Chicago metropolitan area